Maksymilian Fajans (May 5, 1827 in Sieradz – July 28, 1890 in Warsaw) was a Polish artist, lithographer and photographer. Fajans won several prizes at the International Photographic Exhibition organized in 1865 in Berlin and, in 1873, at the Vienna Exhibition.

Life
Fajans was born in Sieradz to Jewish parents and studied at Warsaw's School of Fine Arts (Szkoła Sztuk Pięknych) in 1844–49, and between 1850 and 1853 he worked and stationed in Paris, where he was a pupil of the Dutch–French painter Ary Scheffer.

Fajans established one of the first photography studios in Warsaw.  In 1851–63 he published 14 folios of Wizerunki polskie (Polish Images) after his own drawings, and in 1851–61, 24 folios of Wzory sztuki średniowiecznej (Images of Medieval Art) after drawings by L. Łepkowski, B. Podczaszyński and others.

In chromolithography he published Kwiaty i poezje (Flowers and Poems, 1858, after his own drawings), illustrations for albums and books (Karola Gustawa trofea...—Carl Gustav's Trophies...—by E. Tyszkiewicz, 1856; Album widoków Polski—Album of Polish Views—by N. Orda, 1875–83).  He also collaborated with the publisher, Samuel Orgelbrand.  In addition, he worked in utilitarian graphics (calendars, diplomas).

Portraits

Fajans's portraits of notable contemporaries included: 

Aleksander Fredro
Andrzej Artur Zamoyski
Antoni Edward Odyniec
August Cieszkowski
Antoni Melchior Fijałkowski
Ignacy Feliks Dobrzyński
January Suchodolski
Józef Bohdan Zaleski
Józef Elsner
Karol Libelt
Karol Lipiński
Lucjan Siemieński
Teodor Narbutt
Józef Kremer

See also
List of Poles

External links

Portraits drawn by Fajans (cyfrowe)
A Hunting Certificate from the Workshop of Maksymilian Fajans at the Wilanów Palace Museum
 Works by Maksymilian Fajans in digital library Polona

1827 births
1890 deaths
Photographers from Warsaw
19th-century Polish Jews
People from Sieradz
Polish lithographers